Abraham Khashmanyan, is an Armenian association football manager and former footballer.

References

Armenian footballers
Soviet Armenians
Soviet footballers
Soviet Top League players
Homenetmen Beirut footballers
Lebanese Premier League players
Armenian expatriate footballers
Expatriate footballers in Lebanon
Armenian expatriate sportspeople in Lebanon
Armenian football managers
Footballers from Yerevan
FC Ararat Yerevan managers
FC Kilikia Yerevan managers
FC Gandzasar Kapan managers
FC Alashkert managers
1967 births
Living people
Association football midfielders